Here's Ray Bryant is an album by pianist Ray Bryant recorded in 1976 and released by the Pablo label.

Reception

AllMusic reviewer Scott Yanow called it "a set of soulful and bluesy interpretations of five standards and three originals ... A relaxed outing, not essential but enjoyable".

Track listing
All compositions by Ray Bryant except where noted
 "Girl Talk" (Neal Hefti, Bobby Troup) – 7:20
 "Good Morning Heartache" (Irene Higginbotham, Ervin Drake, Dan Fisher) – 4:42
 "Manteca" (Dizzy Gillespie, Chano Pozo, Gil Fuller) – 6:53	
 "When Sunny Gets Blue" (Marvin Fisher, Jack Segal) – 5:23
 "Hold Back Mon" – 5:58
 "Li'l Darlin'" (Hefti) – 7:57
 "Cold Turkey" – 5:08
 "Prayer Song" – 4:28

Personnel 
Ray Bryant – piano
George Duvivier – bass
Grady Tate – drums

References 

1976 albums
Ray Bryant albums
Pablo Records albums
Albums produced by Norman Granz